Antiotricha districta is a moth of the subfamily Arctiinae. It was described by Francis Walker in 1865. It is found in Colombia.

References

Moths described in 1865
Arctiini
Moths of South America